Jean Moreau de Séchelles (10 May 1690 – 31 December 1761) was a French official and politician.

Biography
Made a maître des requêtes on 13 October 1719, he was the intendant of Hainaut in Valenciennes from 1727 to 1743.  He was the intendant of Lille from 1743 to 1754, while simultaneously the intendant of Flanders from May 1745 until 18 October 1748 during its French occupation.

He was named the controller-general of finances, replacing Jean-Baptiste de Machault d'Arnouville on 20 July 1754.  He served this function until 24 April 1756.  He pursued a daring economic policy, bordering liberalism, while trying to straighten out the royal finances.  Having the king's confidence as the minister of state in 1755, he was consulted about the reversal of alliances from Prussia to Austria.  After suffering a stroke in March 1756, his son-in-law François Marie Peyrenc de Moras was designated by Louis XV to replace him.

He was made an honorary member of the French Academy of Sciences on 14 July 1755, its vice-president in 1756, and its president in 1757.

In 1710, he bought the land of Cuvilly in Oise, which had belonged to the lords of Séchelles.  There he constructed a modern château in place of the feudal castle.  He was consequently called "Moreau de Séchelles."

The Seychelles islands, ceded to the French East India Company in 1756, were named in his honor.

His daughter Marie Hélène Moreau de Séchelles (1715-1798) married René Hérault, the lieutenant general of police of Paris.  From this marriage came Jean-Baptiste Martin Hérault de Séchelles, childhood friend of Louis-Antoine de Bougainville and father of the politician Marie-Jean Hérault de Séchelles.

References 
 Lucien Bély,  "Un intendant en pays occupé : Moreau de Séchelles dans les Pays-Bas pendant la guerre de Succession d'Autriche", in : Études sur l'Ancienne France offertes à Michel Antoine.  Text arranged by Bernard Barbiche and Yves-Marie Bercé. Memoires and documents from l'École des Chartes, n° 69, Paris. École des Chartes, February 2003, pp. 47–60 – 
 Cédric Glineur, Genèse d'un droit administratif sous le règne de Louis XV. Les pratiques de l'intendant dans les provinces du Nord (1726-1754). Orléans, Presses Universitaires d'Orléans, 2005, pp. 19–32 - 
 Cédric Glineur, "Entre libéralisme et protectionnisme : la politique pré-libérale du contrôleur général Moreau de Séchelles", in La Revue administrative, n° 345 (mai 2005), pp. 290–302 - 

1690 births
1761 deaths
Officers of the French Academy of Sciences
French Ministers of Finance